Telecrime was a British drama series that aired on the BBC Television Service from 1938 to 1939 and in 1946. One of the first multi-episode drama series ever made, it is also one of the first television dramas written especially for television not adapted from theatre or radio. Having first aired for five episodes from 1938 to 1939, Telecrime returned in 1946, following the resumption of television after the Second World War, and aired as Telecrimes.

A whodunit crime drama, Telecrime showed the viewer enough evidence to solve the crime themselves. Most episodes were written by Mileson Horton. All seventeen episodes are lost. Aired live, their preservation was technically difficult at the time.

Production
The producers for the 1946 series were Gordon Crier, Stephen Harrison and Douglas Muir.

Plot
Each episode of Telecrime featured a crime, and in a "whodunit" storyline, the viewers were given enough evidence to solve the crime themselves.

Episodes
The programme first aired, as Telecrime, for five episodes from 10 August 1938 to 25 July 1939 on the BBC Television Service. Each episode was ten or twenty minutes long. During the Second World War, the BBC suspended its television service. The channel was brought back on 7 June 1946. From 22 October to 28 November that year, Telecrimes, as it was now called, aired for a further twelve episodes. Each 1946 episode was fifteen minutes long. As was typical at the time, all the episodes were aired live and no recording was made, meaning none survive. The only visual record that survives of the programme is a single publicity photograph.

Telecrime (1938-39)

Telecrimes (1946)

References
General

Specific

External links 
 

1938 British television series debuts
1946 British television series endings
1930s British television series
1940s British television series
BBC television dramas
British live television series
British crime television series
Lost BBC episodes
English-language television shows